Diana, Princess of Wales Hospital (previously Scartho Road Hospital) is a public hospital in Grimsby, Lincolnshire, England. It is managed by the Northern Lincolnshire and Goole Hospitals NHS Foundation Trust.

History

The hospital has its origins in a workhouse infirmary that opened in Scartho Road in October 1894. This facility joined the National Health Service as Grimsby District General Hospital in 1948.

In the 1970s it was decided to build a modern facility on a site to the immediate south of the infirmary. The hospital was officially opened by the Princess of Wales as the Scartho Road Hospital on 26 July 1983 and was renamed in her honour following her death in 1997.

At the forefront of infection control, the Trust was a pioneer of the "clean your hands" campaign in 2003. Subsequent developments included a new Family Services Unit opened in 2004, a new cardiology unit opened in 2005, a new breast care unit opened in 2007  and the first phase of a new Accident and Emergency unit opened in August 2008.

In popular culture
In 1985 the hospital was used for filming scenes of the film Clockwise.

See also
 List of hospitals in England

References

External links 
 Official site

Hospital buildings completed in 1983
Buildings and structures in Grimsby
Hospitals in Lincolnshire
NHS hospitals in England